The women's 100 metre butterfly event at the 1956 Olympic Games took place on 3 and 5 December. This swimming event used the butterfly stroke. Because an Olympic-size swimming pool is 50 metres long, this race consisted of two lengths of the pool.

Medalists

Results

Heats
Eight fastest swimmers from the heats advanced to the finals.

Heat 1

Heat 2

Final

Key: OR = Olympic record

References

External links
Women 100m Butterfly Swimming Olympic Games 1956 Melbourne (AUS), retrieved 2013-12-30

Women's buterfly 100 metre
Women's 100 metre butterfly
1956 in women's swimming
Women's events at the 1956 Summer Olympics